Steven Paulsen (born 1955) is an Australian writer of science fiction, fantasy and horror fiction whose work has been published in books, magazines, journals and newspapers around the world. He is the author of the best selling children's book, The Stray Cat, which has seen publication in several foreign language editions. His short story collection, Shadows on the Wall: Weird Tales of Science Fiction, Fantasy and the Supernatural), won the 2018 Australian Shadows Award for Best Collected Work, and his short stories have appeared in anthologies such as Dreaming Down-Under, Terror Australis: Best Australian Horror, Strange Fruit, Fantastic Worlds, The Cthulhu Cycle: Thirteen Tentacles of Terror, and Cthulhu Deep Down Under: Volume 3.

Paulsen has also written extensively about Australian speculative fiction in various publications including Bloodsongs, Eidolon (Australian magazine), Sirius, Interzone, The Encyclopedia of Fantasy, Fantasy Annual, The St James Guide to Horror, Ghost and Gothic Writers, and The Melbourne University Press Encyclopedia of Australian Science Fiction and Fantasy. In the 1990s he conceived and edited The Australian SF Writer's News, a writer's resource magazine for Australian Speculative Fiction writers, which was later incorporated into Aurealis magazine. He has conducted interviews with a variety of Australian Speculative Fiction writers, and was a judge for 2000 Aurealis Awards.

He returned to writing in 2010 after a ten-year hiatus.

Bibliography

Books 
English Language Editions
The Stray Cat (illustrated by Shaun Tan), Lothian Books, 1996. 
The Stray Cat (illustrated by Shaun Tan), Franklin Watts (UK), 1996. 
Shadows on the Wall (Weird Tales of Science Fiction, Fantasy and the Supernatural), IFWG Publishing Australia, 2018. 

Foreign Language Editions
Misteri Kucing Tersesat (illustrated by Shaun Tan), PT Elex Media Komputindo (Indonesia), 1997. 
Le Chat Errant, Hachette Jeunesse (France), 1998. 
Die Streunende Katz (illustrated by Shaun Tan), G&G Kinder – und Jugendbuch (Germany), 1999. Hardcover 
After Dark (illustrated by Shaun Tan), Publisher: Bookhouse Co., Ltd (Korea), 2002.

Short stories (selected)
"Art Critic" – The Cygnus Chronicler, ed. Neville J. Angove, June 1982
"Logic Loop" – Aphelion Magazine #5, ed. Peter McNamara, Summer 1986/87
"Errand Run" – Aphelion Magazine #5, ed. Peter McNamara, Summer 1986/87
"The Place" – Terror Australis No. 1, ed. Leigh Blackmore, Chris G.C. Sequeira and Bryce J. Stevens. April 1988
"Old Wood" – Terror Australis No. 2, ed. Leigh Blackmore, Chris G.C. Sequeira and Bryce J. Stevens. July 1990
"Two Tomorrow" – Eidolon (Australian magazine) No. 3 – Spring 1990
"Stray Cat" – EOD Magazine No. 7. ed. Chris Masters, September 1992
"Greater Garbo" – Australian & New Zealand PC User, October 1992
"In the Light of the Lamp" – Terror Australis: Best Australian Horror (Hodder & Stoughton) ed. Leigh Blackmore, 1993
"Old Wood (reprint) " – Strange Fruit (Penguin Books) – July 1995
"Two Tomorrow (reprint)" – Beyond (UK) – June 1995
"In the Light of the Lamp" – The Cthulhu Cycle: Thirteen Tentacles of Terror (Chaosium (USA) ed. Robert M. Price, 1996
"The Sorcerer's Looking Glass" – Fantastic Worlds (HarperCollins), ed. Paul Collins, February 1997
"Ma Rung" – Dreaming Down-Under (HarperCollins), ed. Jack Dann and Janeen Webb, 1998
"Severing Ties" (with Maurice Xanthos) – Short and Twisted (Celapene Press) ed. Kathryn Duncan, 2009

Essays (selected)

"The State of the Australian Horror Fiction Magazine" – Bloodsongs No. 1, ed. Chris Masters and Steve Proposch, 1993
"The Quest for Australian Fantasy (with Sean McMullen) " – Aurealis No. 13, 1994
"The Search for Early Australian Horror" – Bloodsongs No. 2, ed. Chris Masters and Steve Proposch, 1994
"The Hunt for Australian Horror (with Sean McMullen)" – Aurealis No. 14, 1994 (reprinted in "The Aurealis Mega Oz SF Anthology", edited by Stephen Higgins and Dirk Strasser (Chimaera Publications), 1999)
"The Art of HAK)" – Bloodsongs No. 3, ed. Chris Masters and Steve Proposch, 1994
"The State of the Aust. Horror Fiction Magazine (reprint) – SF Fan Resource Book, 1995
"Pulp Fiction in Oz)" – Bloodsongs No. 4, ed. Chris Masters and Steve Proposch, 1995
"Kid's Stuff) " – Bloodsongs No. 5, ed. Chris Masters and Steve Proposch, 1995
"The Hunt for Australian HorrorFiction(with McMullen & Congreve)The ScreamFactory#16, 1995
"Australian Children's TV (with Sean McMullen) ) " – Sirius No. 10, 1995
"A Touch of Darkness – Gary Crew)" – Bloodsongs No. 6, ed. Chris Masters and Steve Proposch, 1995
"Cowboys and Atmosfear)" – Bloodsongs No. 7, ed. Chris Masters and Steve Proposch, 1996
"Australian Fantasy (with Sean McMullen)" – The Encyclopedia of Fantasy, ed. John Clute and John Grant, 1997
Author entries (with Sean McMullen) for Conrad Aiken, Gary Crew, Terry Dowling, G. M. Hague, Robert Hood, Victor Kelleher, Rick Kennett, Isaac Bashevis Singer and Rosemary Timperley – St. James Guide to Horror, Ghost & Gothic Writers (St. James Press), ed. David Pringle, 1997
"A History of Australian Horror (with Sean McMullen & Bill Congreve) " –  Bonescribes: Year's Best Australian Horror: 1995 (1996) ed. Bill Congreve and Robert Hood, 1996
"The Quest for Australian Fantasy – Continues (with Sean McMullen) " – Fantasy Annual (USA), 1997
"Fantastique et horreur made in Australie" (with Bill Congreve)" – Ténèbres No. 3, ed. Daniel Conrad (France), July 1998
"Golden Age or New Dawn?" – Aussiecon 3 Souvenir Book for the 57th World Science Fiction Convention, ed. Marc Ortlieb, 1999
"Hakwork: An Appreciation of John Brosnan" – Studies in Australian Weird Fiction Volume 3, ed. Benjamin Szumskyj, 2009

Editor

 The MUP Encyclopaedia of Australian Science Fiction & Fantasy (1998, assistant editor with Paul Collins)
 The Australian SF Writers' News – Editor, issues 1–10 (March 1992 – June 1994)
 Eidolon – Contributing Editor, issues 19–27 (1995–1998)
 The Coode St Review of Science Fiction (with Jonathan Strahan), 1999

Interviews (selected)
Steven Paulsen conducted interviews with a number a leading Australian Speculative Fiction writers during the 1990s. These were notable because Paulsen conducted most of these interviews face-to-face instead of via e-mail, recording the interviews and transcribing the conversations. He also conducted a few interviews in collaboration with Van Ikin.

Stephen R. Donaldson – Dark Horizons (Journal of the British Fantasy Society), Issue 27, Summer 1983
Martin Middleton – The Australian SF Writers' News No. 2, June 1992 and Sirius No. 1, March 1993
Sean McMullen – The Australian SF Writers' News No. 3, September 1992 	
Paul Voermans – The Australian SF Writers' News No. 4, December 1992 and Interzone No. 76, October 1993
Rick Kennett – The Australian SF Writers' News No. 5, March 1993 and Sirius No. 2, June 1993
Victor Kelleher – The Australian SF Writers' News No. 6, June 1993 and Sirius No. 4, February 1994
Sherry-Anne Jacobs – The Australian SF Writers' News No. 9, March 1994 and Sirius No. 5, September 1994
Sean Williams – The Australian SF Writers' News No. 10, June 1994 	
Paul Collins – Sirius No. 7, December 1994 	
Isobelle Carmody – Sirius No. 8, March 1995 	
Paul Jennings – Sirius No. 9, July 1995 	
Sean McMullen – Eidolon No. 21, April 1996 and Interzone No. 107, May 1996
Garth Nix – Eidolon #22/23, September 1996 	
Simon Brown – Eidolon #22/23, February 1997 	
Lucy Sussex – Eidolon No. 24, June 1997 	
Simon Brown "From Sydney to Troy: An Interview with Simon Brown" – Science Fiction: A Review of Speculative Literature # 41, Volume 15, Number 1, 1998 (interview conducted in collaboration with Van Ikin)
Gary Crew – Eidolon No. 27, April 1998 	
Richard Harland – Eidolon No. 27, April 1998 (interview conducted in collaboration with Van Ikin)
Terry Dowling "Smoking Mirrors, with a Hint of Scrimshaw" Interzone No. 146, August 1999 (interview conducted in collaboration with Van Ikin)

Awards

Wins
1990 Eastern Regional Libraries Short Story Competition – Special Local Award for "Talisman”
1995 William Atheling Jr. Award for "The Hunt for Australian Horror Fiction" with Bill Congreve, Sean McMullen, The Scream Factory No. 16.
1997 William Atheling Jr. Award for "Australian Fantasy" with Sean McMullen.
2018 Australian Shadows Awards for "Best Collected Work" for Shadows on the Wall (IFWG Publishing Australia).

Nominations
1996 Ditmar Award nomination for Best Australian Short Fiction: The Stray Cat (runner-up)
1998 William Atheling Jr. Award nomination for Contributions to The MUP Encyclopaedia of Australian Science Fiction & Fantasy
1998 Aurealis Award – Convenor's Award nomination for Contributions to The MUP Encyclopaedia of Australian Science Fiction & Fantasy
2000 William Atheling Jr. Award nomination for The Coode Street Review of Science Fiction with Jonathan Strahan
2000 Ditmar Award for Best Fan Production for The Coode Street Review of Science Fiction with Jonathan Strahan

Contributions

1996 Origins Award for Best Game-Related Fiction won by The Cthulhu Cycle: Thirteen Tentacles of Terror edited by Robert M. Price which contained Paulsen's short story 'In the Light of the Lamp'
1999 William Atheling Jr. Award won by Paul Collins for The MUP Encyclopaedia of Australian Science Fiction & Fantasy for which Paulsen was Assistant Editor and primary contributor
1999 World Fantasy Award for Best Anthology won by Dreaming Down-Under, Edited by Jack Dann and Janeen Webb (HarperCollins Australia/Voyager) which contained Paulsen's short story 'Ma Rung'
1999 Ditmar Award for Best Anthology won by Dreaming Down-Under, Edited by Jack Dann and Janeen Webb (HarperCollins Australia/Voyager) which contained Paulsen's short story 'Ma Rung'

References
Specific

General
Paul Collins (ed). The MUP Encyclopedia of Australian Science Fiction and Fantasy. Melbourne, Vic: Melbourne University press, 1998, pp. 140–41.
 Steven Paulsen official website

External links
Steven Paulsen's official website
Steven Paulsen’s old website
Australian Horror Writers Association
Steven Paulsen at the Internet Speculative Fiction Database

1955 births
Living people
Australian fantasy writers
Australian science fiction writers
Australian male short story writers
Australian horror writers
Writers from Melbourne